Austromitra volucra is a species of small sea snail, marine gastropod mollusk in the family Costellariidae, the ribbed miters.

Description
The length of the shell attains 11 mm; its diameter 5 mm.

The small, solid shell is compact and ovate-fusiform. Its colour is purple-slate or cinnamon, with a narrow pale peripheral band and a pale line below the suture. Five whorls remaining in the decollate specimen studied. The suture is channelled. The earlier whorls are sculptured by fine close radial riblets developed on the periphery and vanishing towards the suture. These disappear on the body whorl, which is smooth Between the riblets run spiral threads. The aperture is elliptical and shows four plaits, decreasing anteriorly. The siphonal canal is short.

Distribution
This marine species is endemic to Australia and occurs off New South Wales and Queensland

References

 Wilson, B. 1994. Australian marine shells. Prosobranch gastropods. Kallaroo, WA : Odyssey Publishing Vol. 2 370 pp.
 Turner H. (2001) Katalog der Familie Costellariidae Macdonald 1860 (Gastropoda: Prosobranchia: Muricoidea). Hackenheim: Conchbooks. 100 pp.

External links

volucra
Gastropods described in 1915
Gastropods of Australia